Unison Whiteman (died 19 October 1983) was a Grenadian politician. He was one of the leaders of the revolutionary New Jewel Movement and Minister of Foreign Affairs in the People's Revolutionary Government from 1981 to 1983

Death 
He was part of the Grenada 17, being executed alongside close friend Maurice Bishop.

References 

Year of birth missing
1983 deaths
Howard University alumni
Foreign ministers of Grenada
New Jewel Movement politicians
20th-century Grenadian politicians

People executed by firearm
People executed by Grenada